Anchee Min (born January 14, 1957, in Shanghai, China) is a Chinese-American author who lives in San Francisco and Shanghai. Min has published two memoirs, Red Azalea and The Cooked Seed: A Memoir, and six historical novels. Her fiction emphasizes strong female characters, such as Jiang Qing, the wife of chairman Mao Zedong, and Empress Dowager Cixi, the last ruling empress of China.

Life
Min was born in Shanghai on January 14, 1957. Her parents were both teachers. She was nine years old when the Cultural Revolution began. As a child, she was a member of the Little Red Guards and was made to report her favorite teacher, who was accused of being an anti-Maoist, to the authorities.

When Min was 17, she was sent to a collective farm near the East China Sea, where she endured horrific conditions and worked 18-hour days. Eventually, she suffered a spinal cord injury. She began an affair with the commander at her camp, a woman named Yin, although she attributes the affair largely to loneliness.

At the collective farm, Min was discovered by a team of talent scouts from the Shanghai Film Studio and was selected to become an actress for her ideal "proletarian good looks." She eventually won the lead role in a propaganda film inspired by Madame Mao. However, the film was never completed. After Mao Zedong's death and the subsequent downfall of Jiang Qing, Min was ostracized and treated badly. She was depressed and considered suicide. With the assistance of her friend, actress Joan Chen, and the sponsorship of her aunt living in Singapore, Min obtained a passport and applied to the School of the Art Institute of Chicago. She then emigrated to the United States. As she was initially entering the country, she was nearly deported when it was discovered that, contrary to what she had put on her visa application, she did not speak English. However, she was able to convince the immigration officer to allow her to enter into the country.

After moving to the US, Min worked five jobs at the same time and learned English by watching Sesame Street.

Min's first husband was a Chinese artist named Qigu Jiang. They had a daughter, Lauryann, who attended Stanford University. According to Min herself, she "lured [Qigu] into marriage, making herself pregnant by him although she knew he did not want a child" and subsequently their marriage fell apart.

In 1999, Min married teacher and writer Lloyd Lofthouse. She filed for divorce in 2014, and it was finalized in 2015.

Min graduated from the School of the Art Institute of Chicago with a B.F.A. and M.F.A. in Fine Arts.

Bibliography

Memoirs
 Red Azalea (Pantheon Books, 1994, ; a New York Times Notable Book); Random House Digital, Inc., 2011,  
The Cooked Seed: A Memoir. Bloomsbury USA, May 7, 2013,

Fiction
Katherine Hamish Hamilton, 1995, 
Becoming Madame Mao (Boston, Mass.: Houghton Mifflin. .). Based on the life of Jiang Qing, the last wife of Mao Zedong.

Empress Orchid Bloomsbury Publishing Incorporated, 2004,  
The Last Empress (Bloomsbury Publishing Plc, 2007). Based on the life of Empress Dowager Cixi, the late 19th and early 20th century Qing dynasty Empress Dowager.
Pearl of China: A Novel. Bloomsbury Publishing, April 9, 2010, . Inspired by the life of Pearl S. Buck as a girl and young woman in China.

References

External links

 Official website

1957 births
Living people
American writers of Chinese descent
Chinese historical novelists
Actresses from Shanghai
Writers from Shanghai
Chinese emigrants to the United States
Chinese women writers
American women writers
School of the Art Institute of Chicago alumni
Red Guards